The Order of Liberty, or the Order of Freedom, is a Portuguese honorific civil order that distinguishes relevant services to the cause of democracy and freedom, in the defense of the values of civilization and human dignity. The order was created in 1976, after the Carnation Revolution of 1974 in which the corporatist authoritarian Estado Novo regime of António de Oliveira Salazar and Marcello Caetano was deposed.  The Grand Collar can also be given by the President of Portugal to former Heads of State and others whose deeds are of an extraordinary nature and particular relevance to Portugal, making them worthy of such a distinction. This can include political acts, physical acts of defense for Portugal, or the good representation of Portugal in other countries.

Grades 
The order includes six classes; in decreasing order of seniority, these are:
  Grand Collar (Grande-Colar – GColL)
  Grand Cross (Grã-Cruz – GCL)
  Grand Officer (Grande-Oficial – GOL)
  Commander (Comendador – ComL)
  Officer (Oficial – OL)
  Knight/Dame (Cavaleiro – CvL / Dama – DmL)

Like the other Portuguese orders, the title of Honorary Member (Membro Honorário – MHL) can be awarded to institutions and locals.

List of the Grand Collar of Liberty
François Mitterrand, former president of the French Republic (1987-10-28)
Juan Carlos I, King of Spain (1988-10-13)
Václav Havel, former president of the Czech Republic (1991-02-20)
António Mascarenhas Monteiro, former president of the Republic of Cape Verde (1992-04-15)
Miguel Trovoada, former president of the Democratic Republic of São Tomé and Príncipe (1992-12-23)
Patricio Aylwin, former president of the Republic of Chile (1993-04-27)
Lech Wałęsa, former president of the Republic of Poland (1993-08-18)
Fernando Henrique Cardoso, former president of the Republic of Brazil (1996-03-08)
Mário Soares, former prime minister and president of the Portuguese Republic (1996-08-29)
Luiz Inácio Lula da Silva, former president of the Republic of Brazil (2003-10-17)
Kofi Annan, former secretary-general of the United Nations (2005-10-11)
António Guterres, current secretary-general of the United Nations (2016-02-02)
Jorge Carlos Fonseca, current President of Cape Verde (2017-04-10)
Henri, Grand Duke of Luxembourg (2017-05-23).
Juan Manuel Santos, former President of Colombia (2017-11-13)
Sergio Mattarella, President of Italy Republic (2017-12-06)
Felipe VI, King of Spain (2018-04-15)

See also
Honorific orders of Portugal

References

External links

 List of the Grand Collar of Freedom

 
1976 establishments in Portugal
Orders of chivalry of Portugal
Orders of chivalry awarded to heads of state, consorts and sovereign family members